The Trisagion ('Thrice Holy'), sometimes called by its opening line Agios O Theos, is a standard hymn of the Divine Liturgy in most of the Eastern Orthodox, Western Orthodox, Oriental Orthodox, and Eastern Catholic churches.

In churches which use the Byzantine Rite, the Trisagion is chanted immediately before the Prokeimenon and the Epistle reading. It is also included in a set of prayers named for it, called the Trisagion Prayers, which forms part of numerous services (the Hours, Vespers, Matins, and as part of the opening prayers for most services).

It is most prominent in the Latin Church for its use on Good Friday. It is also used in the Liturgy of the Hours and in some Catholic devotions.

Form of the prayer 

The Trisagion prayer is an ancient prayer in Christianity.

In Greek:

In Latin:

In English - Literal Translation:

In English - Common Liturgical Translation:

In Aramaic:

History

Traditional origins 

The Greek phrase Trisagion translates as "Thrice Holy" – as in this hymn God is described as holy in three different qualities; Agios o Theos means "Holy God".

The hymn is of great antiquity, and perhaps much older than the event assigned by the Greek Menology as connected to its origin. The tradition recounts that during the reign of Theodosius II (408-450) Constantinople was shaken by a violent earthquake, 24 September, and that whilst the people, the emperor and the Patriarch Proclus of Constantinople (434-446) were praying for heavenly assistance, a child was suddenly lifted into midair, to whom all cried out Kyrie eleison ('Lord, have mercy'). The child was then seen to descend again to the earth, and in a loud voice he exhorted the people to pray : 'Holy God, Holy Mighty, Holy Immortal'. 

The hymn was one of the exclamations of the fathers at the Council of Chalcedon (451), and is common not only to all the Greek Oriental liturgies but was used also in the Gallican Liturgy (see Saint Germain of Paris, d. 576), which shows that the hymn is ancient. Some believe it is extremely ancient, perhaps of apostolic-era origin. However this goes against the menology tradition regarding its origin.

The Coptic Orthodox Church and Armenian Apostolic Church believe that the Trisagion originated from Nicodemus. While taking the body of Christ off the cross with Joseph of Arimathea, Nicodemus saw Jesus Christ's eyes open  and then shouted "Holy God, Holy Mighty, Holy Immortal". Traditionally, it is also considered proof that his Divinity did not part from his humanity.

Greek and Latin 

The Gallican Liturgy refers to it as being sung both in Greek and in Latin: Incipiente præsule ecclesia Ajus [that is, Agios] psallit, dicens latinum cum græco, as also previously in Greek alone, before the Prophetia. Benedict XIV thought that the Greek formula was joined with the Latin in allusion to the divine voice heard at Constantinople. But the explanation seems hardly necessary, in view of the retention of Kyrie eleison in the Roman Liturgy, as well as such Hebrew words as Amen, Alleluia, Hosanna, Sabaoth. It is true that the Kyrie eleison is not joined to a Latin version; on the other hand, it is so simple and occurs so frequently, that its meaning could easily be learned and remembered – whereas the entire Trisagion might well receive a parallel version into Latin.

Modifications in history 

Various additions or modifications made to the Trisagion at certain points in history have been the subject of considerable controversy. According to Pseudo-Zacharias Rhetor, the phrase 'who wast crucified for us' was added to it by Eustathius of Antioch to combat the Arians, although this is dismissed by some scholars. It was more likely written during the time of Peter the Fuller who enforced its use as a sort of "test of orthodoxy against Nestorianism". Those who understood the hymn as being addressed to the Trinity (such as John of Damascus) censured Peter for propagating the teaching of the Theopaschites. Emperor Anastasius I's attempt to adopt the addition in 512 at Constantinople resulted in a riot.

Whether the Trisagion is to be understood as addressed to the Holy Trinity or addressed to God the Son has been a matter of contention, particularly between those who approved of the council of Chalcedon and those who were against it. But, in light of widespread adoption of the hymn with the above addition ('who wast crucified for us'), Calandion, Bishop of Antioch, sought to allay the controversy surrounding it by prefixing the words 'Christ, King'. This had the effect of making the hymn refer directly to the incarnate Word: Holy God, Holy and Strong, Holy and Immortal, Christ, King, who was crucified for us, have mercy on us. Though perhaps well intended, this effort at emendation was ultimately rejected.

Later Severus, who was the Non-Chalcedonian Patriarch of Antioch, wrote to prove the correct ascription of the hymn to the Son of God, and made the use of the emended version standard in his diocese.

The eighty-first canon of the Council of Trullo anathematized anyone who allows the Trisagion to be modified by adding "who was crucified for us" or any other modification.

In the eleventh century, Pope Gregory VII (1073–1085) wrote to the Armenians, who still used the emended formula, instructing them to avoid all occasion for scandal by removing the additions, which Pope Gregory argues (incorrectly) that neither the Roman nor any Eastern Church (save the Armenians themselves) had adopted. The injunction appears to have been ignored. When, centuries later, Roman Catholic union with the Armenians was again discussed, a question was addressed (30 January 1635) to the Congregatio de Propaganda Fide as to whether the Armenian Catholics might still use the formula 'who suffered for us'. The request was answered in the negative. Nevertheless, Armenian Catholic continue to use the traditional formula.

Variations of the traditional formula and Trinitarian ascription are found also in the Armenian Orthodox Liturgy. In these the hymn is addressed to the Redeemer, and versions vary with the feast or office. Thus, the formula of Peter the Fuller (above) is used on all Fridays; on all Sundays: 'risen from the dead'; on Holy Thursday: 'betrayed for us'; on Holy Saturday: 'buried for us'; on the Feast of the Dormition of the Theotokos: 'who came to the death of the Holy Mother and Virgin'; on the feasts of the Holy Cross: 'who was crucified for us'; for the celebration of marriages: 'who took flesh for us', etc.

The Coptic Orthodox, Syriac Orthodox, Malankara Orthodox and other Oriental Orthodox Churches also use the formula 'crucified for us', with minor seasonal variations from the Armenian use.

Usage

In the Divine Liturgy 

When the Trisagion is sung during the Divine Liturgy of the Byzantine Rite, before the Prokeimenon of the Gospel that precedes the Epistle reading, it is normally sung three times to one of many melodies composed for it. This is followed by singing Glory... Now..., the second half of the Trisagion once, and finally the whole Trisagion a fourth time:

Holy God, Holy [and] Mighty, Holy [and] Immortal, have mercy on us.
Holy God, Holy [and] Mighty, Holy [and] Immortal, Have mercy on us.
Holy God, Holy [and] Mighty, Holy [and] Immortal, Have mercy on us.
Glory to the Father, and to the Son, and to the Holy Spirit, both now and ever and to the ages of ages. Amen.
Holy and Immortal, have mercy on us.
Holy God, Holy and Mighty, Holy and Immortal, Have mercy on us.

On the other hand, in the usage of the other, non-Byzantine Eastern Churches, the Trisagion is simply sung thrice, with no  Glory... Now....

In the East Syriac Rite, used by the Assyrian Church of the East and Syro-Malabar Catholic Church, the Trisagion is sung towards the beginning of the Holy Qurbana, before the Old Testament Readings.

In the West Syriac Rite, used by the Syriac Orthodox Church, Malankara Mar Thoma Syrian Church, Malankara Orthodox Syrian Church, the Syriac Catholic Church, Syro-Malankara Catholic Church and in a hybrid form, the Maronite Church and other derived rites of Syriac Christianity, the Trisagion is sung towards the beginning of the Holy Qurbana (Divine Liturgy), after the Old Testament Readings and the Introductory Hymn.

In the Armenian Rite, used by the Armenian Orthodox Church and the Armenian Catholic Church, the Trisagion occurs early in the Divine Liturgy, coming after the troparion of the Monogenes (Only-begotten Son) and the Midday first Antiphon. The choir sings the Trisagion during the lesser entrance of the Gospel Books.

The Trisagion also has a similar place in the liturgies of the Coptic Orthodox Church of Alexandria, the Ethiopian Orthodox Tewahedo Church and Eritrean Orthodox Tewahedo Church, as well as the Coptic Catholic Church and the Ethiopic Catholic Church.

As part of the Trisagion Prayers 

During most services of the Eastern Orthodox Church, the Trisagion is combined with several other prayers to form a unit, often called simply the Trisagion Prayers. This set of prayers forms part of the opening prayers of most services, and is also located within many of the Hours and daily cycle of services.

The full version normally looks like this:

Holy God, Holy [and] Mighty, Holy [and] Immortal, have mercy on us. (three times)
Glory... Both now...
All-holy Trinity, have mercy on us. Lord, cleanse us from our sins. Master, pardon our iniquities. Holy God, visit and heal us for thy Name's sake.
Lord, have mercy. (three times)
Glory... Both now...
Our Father...

While it is possible that the Trisagion has origins in the Biblical 'thrice holy' of Isaiah 6:3 (the Sanctus: Holy, holy, holy, Lord of Sabaoth. Heaven and earth are full of your glory', etc.), they are today separate prayers. The latter is used at a different point in the Liturgy (in the Divine Liturgy, during the anaphora).

The trisagion is also sung at the entry of the coffin into the church at a funeral and when the coffin is carried to the grave. It is also sung at the conclusion of the Great Doxology.

In the Latin liturgy 

In the Latin Church, the main regular use of the Trisagion is on Good Friday, when it is sung during the ceremony of the Adoration of the Cross, in Popule meus. In the Sistine Chapel, the traditional setting was the polyphonic musical setting of Palestrina. During this service, the hymn is sung by two choirs, alternately in Greek and Latin, originally two antiphonal Greek and Latin choirs, as follows:
Greek (First) Choir: Hágios ho Theós. (Holy God)
Latin (Second) Choir: Sanctus Deus.
Greek (First) Choir: Hágios iskhūrós. (Holy Strong One)
Latin (Second) Choir: Sanctus fortis.
Greek (First) Choir: Hágios āthánatos, eléēson hēmâs. (Holy Immortal One, have mercy on us)
Latin (Second) Choir: Sanctus immortális, miserére nobis.

The hymn is sung in this manner thrice, responding to the first three of twelve reproaches.

In the Latin Church, the Trisagion is employed in the hour of Prime, in the ferial Preces, on ferias of Advent and Lent and on common Vigils. There is a Chaplet to the Holy Trinity used by the Order of the Most Holy Trinity called 'The Trisagion' or the 'Angelic Trisagion', which makes use of both forms of the Trisagion. It also occurs in the Little Office of the Blessed Virgin and in the Chaplet of Divine Mercy.

In the Roman Catholic church, an indulgence of 100 days was once associated with the Trisagion when prayed once a day together with the Sanctus, with a contrite heart to adore the Holy Trinity.

Anglican Communion

Book of Common Prayer 

The Episcopal Church's 1979 Book of Common Prayer introduced the Trisagion into the Eucharist in both Rite One and Rite Two as part of the Word of God.  In Rite One it follows the Summary of the Law.  In Rite Two it can be used as an alternative to the Kyrie eleison, which follows the Collect for Purity and precedes the Collect of the Day.  The form of the Trisagion found in the 1979 BCP is as follows:

Holy God,
Holy and Mighty,
Holy Immortal One,
Have mercy upon us.

Common Worship 

In Common Worship used by the Church of England, the Trisagion is used principally as a concluding prayer of the Litany in the following form:

Holy God, holy and strong, holy and immortal, have mercy upon us.

It is also used in the Good Friday liturgy in the same way as in the Roman Catholic Church.

Other languages

Africa 
Afrikaans:

Amharic (Ethiopia):

Qədus ʾƎgziäbḥer, Qədus Ḫayal, Qədus Ḥəyaw, Yämaymot, ʾÄbetu Yəqər Bälän.

Ge'ez (Classical Ethiopic):

Qədus ʾƎgziäbḥer, Qədus Ḫayal, Qədus Ḥəyaw, Zäʾiyəmäwət, Täśahalänä ʾƎgzio.

Tigrinya:

Qədus ʾƎgziäbḥer, Qədus Ḫayal, Qədus Ḥəyaw, Zäyəmäwət, Yəꝗər Bäläləna.

Asia 

Hebrew:

Elohim HaQádosh, Guibor HaQádosh, El-Olam HaQádosh: Rájem Ná.
Arabic:

Quddūsun Allāh, Quddūsun al-qawī, Quddūsun alladhī lā yamūt urḥamnā.

Cebuano:

Chinese:
 (Traditional characters)
 (Simplified characters)
Zhì shèng zhī Shàngdì, zhì shèng jí dà néng zhī Shàngdì, zhì shèng jí yǒngshēng zhī Shàngdì, liánmǐn wǒmen. (pinyin)

Filipino:

Indonesian:

Japanese:

Seinaru Kami, Seinaru Yūki, Seinaru Jōseinomonoya, Warerao Awaremeyo.

Korean:

Georukhasin Haneunimiyo, Georukhago Jeonneunghan Iyo, Georukhago Yeongwonhashin Iyo, Urirul Bulsanghi Yeogisoseo.

Malayalam:
കന്ദീശ ആലാഹ, കന്ദീശ ഹൈലസാനാ, കന്ദീശ ലാ മോയൂസ, എതറാഹിം ആലെയ്ൻ. (East Syriac Rite) 
Kandeesha Alaha, Kandeesha Hailsana, Kandeesha la Moyusa, Etharahem Aleyn.  
കാദീശത് ആലോഹോ, കാദീശത് ഹെൽതോനോ, കാദീശത് ലോ മോയൂതൊ ഇതരാഹേം ആലെയ്ൻ. (West Syriac Rite)  
Kadeeshath Aloho, Kadeeshath Helthono, Kadeeshath lo Moyutho Itharahem Aleyn.

Marathi:

Pavitra Deva, Pavitra Shaktiman, Pavitra Amartyaa, Aamhaavar Daya Kar.

East Syriac:

Qadisha Alaha, Qadisha Haylthana, Qadisha La Mayutha, 'ithraham 'alayn.

West Syriac:

Qadishath Aloho, Qadishath Haylthono, Qadishath Lo Moyutho, ethraham 'alayn.(Holy God, Holy and Strong, Holy and Immortal, have mercy on us.)Chavacano:

Vietnamese:

 Europe 

Albanian:

Classical Armenian:Soorp Asdvadz, soorp yev hzor, soorp yev anmah, vor khatchetsar vasn mer, vołormya mez։"Holy God, Holy and mighty, Holy and immortal, who wast crucified for our sake, have mercy on us."Soorp Asdvadz, soorp yev hzor, soorp yev anmah, vor haryar i meṙelots, vołormya mez։"Holy God, Holy and mighty, Holy and immortal, who didst rise from the dead, have mercy on us."

Belarusian:
 (Cyrillic orthography)Śviaty Boža, Śviaty Mocny, Śviaty Nieśmiarotny, pamiłuj nas. (Latin orthography)

Bulgarian:Svetij Bože, Svetij Krepki, Svetij Bezsmărtni, pomiluj nas!Church Slavonic:
Old Church Slavonic:svętyi bože, svętyi krěpŭkyi, svętyi bezsŭmrĭtĭnyi, pomilui nasŭ.Russian Church Slavonic:Svjatyj Bože, Svjatyj Kriepkyj, Svjatyj Bezsmertnyj, pomiłuj nas.Croatian:

Danish:

Dutch:

Estonian:

Finnish:

French:

Georgian:Ts'mindao Ghmerto, Ts'mindao Dzliero, Ts'mindao Uk'vdavo, shegvits'qalen chven.German:

Hungarian:

Icelandic:

Italian:

Low Mari (spoken in the Russian Federation):Svyatoy Yumo, Svyatoy Kuatle, Svyatoy Kolydymo, memnam serlage.Macedonian:Sveti Bože, Sveti Krepki, Sveti Besmrtni, pomiluj ne!Norwegian:

Polish:

Portuguese:

Romanian:

Russian:Svyaty Bozhe, Svyaty Krepky, Svyaty Bessmertny, pomiluy nas!Serbian:
 (Cyrillic orthography)Sveti Bože, Sveti Krepki, Sveti Besmrtni, pomiluj nas. (Latin orthography)

Slovak:

Spanish:

Swedish:

Turkish:

Ukrainian:Svâtij Bože, Svâtij Krìpkij, Svâtij Bezsmertnij, pomiluj nas. (ISO 9 transliteration)Sviatyi Bozhe, Sviatyi Kripkyi, Sviatyi Bezsmertnyi, pomylui nas.'' (English transilteration)

Anti-Trisagion 
Some services call for replacing the Trisagion with an alternative invocation known as an Anti-Trisagion.  The variants of the hymn include:
 "Before Thy Cross we bow down in worship, Master, and we glorify Thy Holy Resurrection."
 "As many as have been baptized into Christ have put on Christ. Alleluia." — from

References

Sources 
 
 
 Liber Usualis Missae et Officii: Paris n.d.

External links 
 
 

Genres of Byzantine music
Eastern Christian hymns
Christian prayer
Catholic liturgy
Religious formulas